Glenea viridescens is a species of beetle in the family Cerambycidae. It was described by Maurice Pic in 1927. It is known from Vietnam.

Varietas
 Glenea viridescens var. bialbopunctata Breuning, 1956
 Glenea viridescens var. coeruleosuturalis Breuning, 1956

References

viridescens
Beetles described in 1927